
Gmina Szydłowiec is an urban-rural gmina (administrative district) in Szydłowiec County, Masovian Voivodeship, in east-central Poland.

Villages
Apart from the town of Szydłowiec, Gmina Szydłowiec contains the villages and settlements of Barak, Chustki, Ciechostowice, Długosz, Hucisko, Jankowice, Korzyce, Krzcięcin, Łazy, Majdów, Marywil, Mszadla, Omięcin, Rybianka, Sadek, Świerczek, Świniów, Szydłówek, Wilcza Wola, Wola Korzeniowa, Wysocko, Wysoka, Zastronie and Zdziechów.

Neighbouring gminas
Gmina Szydłowiec is bordered by the town of Skarżysko-Kamienna and by the gminas of Bliżyn, Chlewiska, Jastrząb, Mirów, Orońsko, Skarżysko Kościelne and Wieniawa.

References
Polish official population figures 2006

Szydlowiec
Szydłowiec County